Gatchell may refer to:

Places

 Gatchell, Greater Sudbury, an urban neighbourhood in Greater Sudbury, Ontario, Canada.

People

 John Gatchell (1945–2004), American jazz trumpeter
 Lloyd B. Gatchell (1901–1969), American philatelist